Samuel Birch (3 November 1813 – 27 December 1885) was a British Egyptologist and antiquarian.

Biography
Birch was the son of a rector at St Mary Woolnoth, London. He was educated at Merchant Taylors' School. From an early age, his manifest tendency to the study of out-of-the-way subjects well suited his later interest in archaeology. After brief employment in the Record Office, he obtained, in 1836, an appointment to the antiquities department of the British Museum. The appointment was due to his knowledge of Chinese, which was unusual at that time. He soon broadened his research to Egyptian. When the cumbrous department came to be divided, he was appointed to head the Egyptian and Assyrian branch.

In the latter language he had assistance, but for many years there was only one other person in the institution, in a different department, who knew anything of ancient Egyptian. The entire arrangement of the department devolved upon Birch. He found time nevertheless for Egyptological work of the highest value, including a hieroglyphical grammar and dictionary, translations of The Book of the Dead and papyrus Harris I, and numerous catalogues and guides.

He further wrote what was long a standard history of pottery, investigated the Cypriote syllabary, and proved by various publications that he had not lost his old interest in Chinese. Paradoxical in many of his views on things in general, he was sound and cautious as a philologist; while learned and laborious, he possessed much of the instinctive divination of genius.

His grandfather, also named Samuel Birch, was a renowned dramatist and Lord Mayor of London (1814).

He was elected as a member of the American Philosophical Society in 1869.

He died on 27 December 1885 and is buried in Highgate Cemetery.

Publications 

 Analecta Sinensia, 1841. 
Select Papyri in the Hieratic Character, 3 pts. fol. 1841–4. 
 Tablets from the Collection of the Earl of Belmore, 1843. 
 Friends till Death (from Chinese), 1845. 
 An Introduction to the Study of the Egyptian Hieroglyphics, 1857. 
 History of Ancient Pottery, 2 vols. 1858. John Murray, London.
 Memoire sur une Patere, 1858. 
 Select Papyri, pt, ii. 18 (50). 
 A Description of the Collection of Ancient Marbles in the British Museum Part 11. 1861. 
 ChineseWidow (from Chinese), 1862. (From ch'in ku ch'i kuan)
 Elfin Foxes (from Chinese), 1863. 
 Papyrus of Nas-Khem, 1863. 
 Facsimiles of Egyptian Relics, 1863. 
 Facsimiles of two Papyri, 1863. 
 Inscriptions in the Himyaritic Character, 1863. 
 Egypt's Place in Universal History, 1867. (Vol. 5 - contributed the first extensive English translation of the Book of the Dead) 
 The Casket of Gems (from Chinese), 1872.  (From ch'in ku ch'i kuan)
 History of Egypt, 1875. 
 Facsimile of Papyrus of Rameses III, fol. 1876. 
 The Monumental History of Egypt, 1876. 
  Egyptian Texts, 1877. 
 Catalogue of Egyptian Antiquities at Alnwick Castle, 1880. 
 The Coffin of Amamu (unfinished).

Notes

References

External links
 
 

1813 births
1885 deaths
Burials at Highgate Cemetery
Birch, Samuels
English philologists
People educated at Merchant Taylors' School, Northwood
Employees of the British Museum
Victorian writers
19th-century English writers
19th-century antiquarians
19th-century archaeologists
Members of the Göttingen Academy of Sciences and Humanities